Leonard Abraham Gordon is a historian of South Asia, especially of Bengal, whose 1990 book Brothers Against the Raj: A Biography of Indian Nationalist Leaders Sarat and Subhas Chandra Bose is considered the definitive biography of Subhas Chandra Bose.

Education and career
Gordon graduated from Amherst College, and received his Ph.D. from Harvard University.  He was a professor of history at Brooklyn College, City University of New York, and has emeritus status there now.  He was also the Director of the Southern Asia Institute at Columbia University.

Gordon's revised Harvard dissertation, Bengal: the Nationalist Movement won the (now discontinued) biennial Watumull Prize of the American Historical Association in 1974, a prize recognizing "the best book on the history of India originally published in the United States."  Gordon has been praised for his "narration of political events."

Subhas Bose Biography
His book, Brothers Against the Raj is widely regarded as the definitive biography of Subhas Chandra Bose.

Bibliography

See also
Joyce Lebra
Peter W. Fay
Death of Subhas Chandra Bose

Notes

References

 

 

Historians of India
Living people
Indian National Army
Harvard University alumni
Amherst College alumni
Brooklyn College faculty
Year of birth missing (living people)